Glendora Public Market is a food hall located in the San Gabriel Valley community of Glendora, California. Glendora Public Market opened on 26 September 2020. It is located on Route 66 in the former premises of the historic Wonder Bread factory, which was first built in 1948 and was initially slated for demolition. As of October 2020, it is the single largest food hall in the San Gabriel Valley.

See also 

 Food hall
 Glendora, California

References

External links 

 

Shopping malls in the San Gabriel Valley
Glendora, California
Food halls
2020 establishments in California
Food markets in the United States